Hans Christian Martinus Kundsen (16 August 1865 – 6 January 1947) was a Danish artist. He is remembered principally for his landscape paintings mainly of the area of North Zealand which constituted his world of motifs.

Biography
Knudsen was born in Roskilde, Denmark. 
He was the son of Martinus Knudsen (1831–88) and Johanne Cathrine Jensine Crone (1828–1904).

He trained as a decoration painter in Odense with Carl Frederik Aagaard (1833-1895) from 1881-84. From 1888-96, he trained  to the school operated by Kristian Zahrtmann (1843–1917). He  exhibited regularly at the Charlottenborg Spring Exhibition from 1893–1946.

For many years Knudsen lived  close to the forest edge of Ganløse Ore in Egedal, right on the border with Værløse in Furesø. He belonged to the group of painters called the Værløsemalerne with art frequently focused on the area of around  Ganløse  and Værløse.   Knudsen was inspired by the picturesque perceptions and lyrical coloristic projections of Albert Gottschalk (1866–1906) and Laurits Andersen Ring (1854–1933).

He received the Eckersberg Medal in 1917, the  Serdin Hansens Prize in 1919, the Alfred Benzon Prize  in 1933, 1942 and the Thorvaldsen Medal in 1944. In 1909, he married  Sørine Kristine Thomsen (1880-1964).  He died during 1947 west of Ganløse at  Slagslunde.

References

External links
Hans Knudsen's biography from Egedal Historie (in Danish)

1865 births
1947 deaths
19th-century Danish painters
Danish male painters
20th-century Danish painters
Danish landscape painters
People from Roskilde
People from Egedal Municipality
Recipients of the Thorvaldsen Medal
Recipients of the Eckersberg Medal
19th-century Danish male artists
20th-century Danish male artists